Auchentoshan distillery is a single malt whisky distillery in the west of Scotland. The name Auchentoshan is from Gaelic  and translates as "corner of the field". The distillery is also known as "Glasgow's Malt Whisky" due to its proximity to Glasgow and "the breakfast whisky" due to its sweet and delicate nature. Auchentoshan is located at the foot of the Old Kilpatrick Hills on the outskirts of Clydebank in West Dunbartonshire near the Erskine Bridge. It is one of six malt whisky distilleries in the Scottish Lowlands along with Bladnoch, Glenkinchie and recently Daftmill Distillery, Annandale Distillery and Ailsa Bay Distillery.

History
The Auchentoshan distillery was built in 1823. The original distillery was built by a corn merchant named John Bulloch and managed with his son. Following their bankruptcy in 1834, the distillery was sold to Alexander Filshie, a local farmer and it remained under control of his family until 1877, following a bad harvest when it was sold again to several owners. In 1877, the distillery was acquired by the Glasgow distillers John & George MacLachlan. The area around the distillery was damaged during the Second World War and a bomb crater behind the distillery now acts as a pond for cooling water. The distillery was bought by Eadie Cairns in 1969, who rebuilt it completely. Cairns sold Auchentoshan to whisky blenders Stanley P Morrison (later to become Morrison Bowmore distillers) in 1984. Suntory invested in Morrison Bowmore in 1989 and in 1994, they acquired 100% of its holdings. In May 2014, Beam Inc. and Suntory Holdings Limited merged to create Beam Suntory Inc, who are now the owners of Auchentoshan and other Morrison Bowmore holdings.

Production
Unusual for a Scottish distillery, Auchentoshan practices triple distillation. The mash tun at the distillery is a modern stainless steel semi-Lauter mash tun, with a copper canopy. Generally the final stage of Scotch whisky production involves distilling the fermented mash in two copper stills. In Auchentoshan, a third still (known as the "Intermediate Still") helps to give a final spirit strength of 81% ABV (162 proof). This triple distillation, in addition to an unpeated malt, gives Auchentoshan a more delicate and sweet flavour than many Scotch whiskies. Maturation is mainly in ex-bourbon barrels and ex-sherry butts, though some Auchentoshans will mature in French wine casks.

Special bottlings are released periodically, including the oldest, a 50-year-old Auchentoshan distilled in 1957 and released in 2008.
The distillery has a visitor centre and conference facilities, both completed in 2005, and is open to the public for tours every day of the week.

Awards and reviews
Auchentoshan offerings have performed well at international spirit ratings competitions.  Its 16- and 18-year scotches received double gold medals at the 2008 San Francisco World Spirits Competition. The Auchentoshan Three Wood expression won "the best Scotch Whisky and Cigar Combination" in the world when paired with the Bolivar Inmensas.

See also
 Whisky
 Scotch whisky
 List of whisky brands
 List of distilleries in Scotland

References

Notes

Bibliography

External links
 Auchentoshan official website
 Morrison Bowmore Distillers, Limited (distillers of Auchentoshan and other Scotch whiskys)

Distilleries in Scotland
Scottish malt whisky
Buildings and structures in West Dunbartonshire
Tourist attractions in West Dunbartonshire
1823 establishments in Scotland
British companies established in 1823
Companies based in West Dunbartonshire
Food and drink companies established in 1823